Nanjing Lukou International Airport   is the main airport serving Nanjing (the capital of Jiangsu Province) and a major airport serving the Yangtze River Delta area. As of 2020, it is the 12th busiest civil airport in China, Dropping one place from 2019 after being overtaken by Zhengzhou Xinzheng International Airport. Phase I of the Ninggao Intercity Line and Line S1 of the Nanjing Metro link the airport with Nanjing South railway station.

Nanjing is the hub for China Eastern Airlines' Jiangsu Company, Shenzhen Airlines' Jiangsu branch and Juneyao Air's Jiangsu branch. China Southern Airlines as well operates a considerable number of flights there. Despite not operating as much flights as some other airlines, Beijing Capital Airlines and Air Travel also set up bases in Nanjing. Nanjing is the main base for China Postal Airlines, with pure cargo service to all major cities in China, handling express mail and cargo transportation for China Post. In 2020, the airport handled 19,906,576 passengers and 389,362.4 tons of freight after experiencing a -34.9% drop in passenger traffic due to the impact of COVID-19 pandemic.

History
Construction of Nanjing Lukou International Airport started on 28 February 1995, and was completed two years later. When the airport opened on 1 July 1997, all civilian operations were transferred to it from Nanjing Dajiaochang Airport, and Nanjing Dajiaochang was converted to a Chinese military air base.

Although Nanjing Lukou had been designated an international airport since commencing operations, China's state administrations only approved it for foreign aircraft on 18 November 1997.

In 2006, China Post started building its express logistics center at Nanjing Lukou to handle its express mail services. Initial construction was completed by 2009, with additional facilities and functions added continuously. The final project, as planned, would be the largest in Asia and the third-largest in the world of its kind.

In 2009, the airport handled 10 million passengers. On March 26, 2010, Singapore airlines officially ceases its operation between Singapore Changi and Nanjing. In 2013, that number surpassed 15 million, which was 3 million above the terminal's designed operational capacity. In preparation for the 2014 Summer Youth Olympics, hosted by Nanjing, Terminal 2 was completed after more than three years of construction. Also completed were a new parallel runway with taxiways, a new tower, new aircraft parking positions, and new cargo handling facilities. On 12 July 2014, all flights were relocated to Terminal 2, and Terminal 1 was closed for renovation.

The new facilities removed the bottleneck caused by the limited capability of the old terminal and runway. In November 2014, with the launching of the Phase 2 expansion and optimization of neighboring air traffic patterns, authorities approved an increase of peak-hour flight volume from 28 flights per hour to 38 flights per hour.

With the added capacity, Nanjing Airport has seen rapid increase in both aircraft movement and total passengers. In 2015, the number of total passengers exceeded 19 million (until 28 December), that is 2.87 million on top of 2014, a 17.7% increase compared to the same period of the previous year. The airport continues to see substantial increase into 2016, which saw 29,210 aircraft movements and 3.39 million passengers handled in January and February, a 16.9% and a 21.2% increase respectively, comparing to the same period 2015.

On October 27, 2019, Malaysia Airlines ceased its operation between Kuala Lumpur and Nanjing despite great passenger traffic performance in an effort to readjust its operation model overseas.

Composition

The airport consists of two terminals, two 3600-meter runways (paralleled by three taxiways and connected by two taxiways), two control towers, a cargo center, a transportation center, and an apron. Adjacent to, but not belonging to, the airport is the China Post express logistics center and the base for China Postal Airlines.

The older section of the airport consists of:
Terminal 1 ( floor space 160,000m², 80 check-in counters and 33 security lanes.
one northern runway (length 3600 m, width 60 m, 4E rating)
one runway (length 3600 m, width 45 m)
a cargo center (34,000m²)
an apron (447,000m²)
a control tower (height 87 m)
Terminal 1 was closed on 14 July 2014 for renovation, it reopened on 29 July 2020 and serves all domestic flights except China Eastern airlines and Shenzhen Airlines flights which depart exclusively from Terminal 2.

The Phase 2 expansion includes:
Terminal 2 (263,000m² floor space, 35 boarding bridges, annual capacity 18 million passengers)
a new 4F-rating southern runway and two parallel taxiways
two taxiways connecting the northern and southern runways
20 aircraft parking positions
a second control tower (height 107 m)
an 11,000m² carpark
a transportation center, which seats a subway station, a coach station, a Pullman Hotel, and shopping and dining facilities
The two terminals are also connected by the transportation center structure.

Airlines and destinations

Passenger

Cargo

Ground transportation

Airport shuttle

City to airport
 From Nanjing South Railway Station: 6:00–21:00, every 20 minutes, duration 40 minutes
 From Nanjing Railway Station East Square (with a stop at 221 Middle Longpan Road): 5:40–21:00, every 20 minutes, duration 80 minutes

Airport to city
 Line 1: 30 minutes after the first landing to the last landing of the day (stops: Yuhua Square, Qinhong Bridge, Xihuamen, Nanjing railway station); max. interval 30 minutes
 Line 2: 9:30–22:30 (stops: Cuipingshan Hotel, Nanjing South railway station, Zhonghuamen Subway Station), max. interval 30 minutes

Expressway
The airport is accessed by Konggang Road, which connects to the Airport Expressway. The Airport Expressway is part of S55 Ningxuan (Nanjing-Xuancheng) Expressway.

Rail
The Lukou Airport Station on Line S1 of the Nanjing Metro links the airport with Nanjing South Railway Station. Operation hours are from 6:00 to 22:40(in both directions), at 9'57" intervals in peak hours and 13'16" intervals in low hours. The entire journey takes approximately 35 minutes and costs 7 RMB. At Nanjing South railway station, passengers can transfer to high-speed trains to other cities, coach services to nearby towns, Nanjing Metro Line 1, Nanjing Metro Line 3, Nanjing Metro Line S3 and bus services.

Taxi
Taxis are easily accessible outside the arrivals hall. Fare between the airport and city area ranges from ¥80 to ¥120.

See also
Nanjing Dajiaochang Airport
Nanjing Liuhe Airport
List of airports in China
List of the busiest airports in the People's Republic of China

References

External links

Nanjing Lukou International Airport (official website)

Transport in Nanjing
Airports in Jiangsu
Airports established in 1997
1997 establishments in China